General elections were held in Gibraltar on 6 February 1980. The result was a victory for the Association for the Advancement of Civil Rights, which won eight of the 15 seats in the House of Assembly.

Electoral system
The electoral system for the House of Assembly allowed each voter to vote for up to eight candidates.

Results

References

Gibraltar
General
General elections in Gibraltar
Gibraltar
Election and referendum articles with incomplete results